The Tyranny of Big Tech is a 2021 book written by Senator Josh Hawley of Missouri. The book's claim is that Facebook, Google, Amazon and Apple (Big Tech) are the "gravest threat to American liberty since the monopolies of the Gilded age" because of their
anti-conservative bias. Hawley says that he is fighting to "recover America's populist democracy". The book's original publisher, Simon & Schuster, cancelled the contract on January 7, 2021 after the storming of the United States Capitol on January 6 and Hawley's rejection of electoral votes in the 2020 United States presidential election. Regnery Publishing acquired the book on January 18 with a May 4 release date.

Background
On October 16, 2020, Simon & Schuster announced they would publish The Tyranny of Big Tech. In a statement, Hawley said:
“At a time when these platforms are determining elections, banning inconvenient political views, lining politicians’ pockets with hundreds of millions of dollars, and addicting our kids to screens, I want to draw attention to the robber barons of the modern era, this is the fight to recover America's populist democracy. That is why I am writing this book.”

On January 7, one day after the 2021 storming of the United States Capitol, Simon and Schuster retracted the publication of Hawley's book stating that "after witnessing the disturbing, deadly insurrection that took place on Wednesday in Washington, D.C., [we have] decided to cancel publication of The Tyranny of Big Tech." Additionally, the company expressed how they "cannot support Senator Hawley after his role in what became a dangerous threat to our democracy and freedom." Hawley rebuked the decision on Twitter, describing the action as "Orwellian." Hawley also defended his actions as "representing [his] constituents" and that he would "see [Simon and Schuster] in court" for breach of contract and restricting his First Amendment rights.

On January 18, conservative publisher Regnery Publishing picked up the book. In a press release, Regnery’s president, Thomas Spence released a statement saying that “[i]t’s discouraging to see them cower before the ‘woke mob,’ as Senator Hawley correctly calls it. Regnery is proud to stand in the breach with him. And the warning in his book about censorship obviously couldn’t be more urgent.” The book was published in May 2021 and quickly became a best seller.

References 

2021 non-fiction books
American political books
Books about media bias
Regnery Publishing books